Tagavere may refer to several places in Estonia:

Tagavere, Lääne County, village in Taebla Parish, Lääne County
Tagavere, Saare County, village in Orissaare Parish, Saare County